Cucharmoy is a former commune in the Seine-et-Marne department in the Île-de-France region in north-central France. On 1 January 2019, it was merged into the new commune Chenoise-Cucharmoy.

See also
 Communes of the Seine-et-Marne department

References

External links

 1999 Land Use, from IAURIF (Institute for Urban Planning and Development of the Paris-Île-de-France région) 
 

Former communes of Seine-et-Marne
Populated places disestablished in 2019